Novak Bošković (23 May 1989 – 3 February 2019) was a Serbian handball player.

Club career
Born in Sombor, Bošković started playing handball at Crvenka. He also played for Vrbas and Priboj, before moving abroad. Between 2010 and 2017, Bošković spent five seasons with Maccabi Tel Aviv on three occasions, winning two national championships in 2014 and 2016.

International career
At international level, Bošković represented Serbia at the 2016 European Championship.

Death
Bošković committed suicide by gunshot at his home in Crvenka on 3 February 2019. He was survived by his wife and his daughter who was born a few months prior to his death.

Honours
Maccabi Tel Aviv
 Ligat Ha'Al: 2013–14, 2015–16
Hapoel Rishon LeZion
 Ligat Ha'Al: 2017–18

References

External links
 MKSZ record
 

1989 births
2019 suicides
Sportspeople from Sombor
Serbian male handball players
RK Crvenka players
RK Vrbas players
CS Dinamo București (men's handball) players
Expatriate handball players
Serbian expatriate sportspeople in Israel
Serbian expatriate sportspeople in Slovenia
Serbian expatriate sportspeople in Qatar
Serbian expatriate sportspeople in Hungary
Serbian expatriate sportspeople in Romania
Suicides by firearm in Serbia